The Alkali Lakes are a series of three large playas located in the Surprise Valley of northeastern California, United States. From north to south they are known as Upper, Middle and Lower Alkali Lake. Upper Alkali Lake is often known simply as Upper Lake, and Lower Alkali Lake as Lower Lake. Although mostly located in Modoc County, California, the eastern edges of Middle and Lower Lakes touch Washoe County, Nevada. The Warner Mountains are located to the west of the three lakes. The lake beds are typically flooded with shallow water in the winter but dry up during most summers.

Location and history
Prior to European settlement, the area was inhabited by the Kidütökadö, a band of the Northern Paiute. The town of Fort Bidwell is located at the north end of Upper Alkali Lake. Lake City and Cedarville are located between and west of Upper and Middle Alkali Lakes. Eagleville is situated south of Lower Alkali Lake. California State Route 299 crosses the basin in-between the Upper and Middle lakes.

The lakes lie at the bottom of a graben created by the Surprise Valley Fault, which has experienced nearly a mile (1.6 km) of vertical displacement, resulting in the steep eastern scarp of the Warner Mountains. They are a remnant of Glacial Lake Lahontan, which existed up until about 12,000 years ago during the last ice age.

The surrounding area has been used for agriculture since the first settlers arrived in the 1840s. The valley was named "Surprise" because of the relatively abundant greenery, supported by streams flowing from the Warner Mountains, in stark contrast to the surrounding high desert country. With growing water use and drought conditions in the 21st century, falling groundwater levels in the basin are an increasing concern.

Salt was extracted from briny wells on the east side of Middle Alkali Lake until 1943.

Hydrology
The lakes form an endorheic (closed) drainage system in the western edge of the Great Basin. Despite the nomenclature, the direction of water flow is not from north to south.

The lakes are seasonally flooded with alkaline water in most years, drying out in the summer.

Upper Alkali Lake
The lake is fed by Bidwell, Second, Goose, Wilkinson, Mill, Releford and Soldier Creeks, as well as overflow from Middle Alkali Lake if the level of that lake is high enough.

Middle Alkali Lake
Middle Alkali Lake is the largest by both surface area and drainage area. Creeks flowing into the lake include Sand, Fortymile, Cedar, Deep, Granger, Milk, Cottonwood, Owl and Raider Creeks. Between Middle and Lower Alkali Lakes there is a smaller lake called Cambron Lake, fed by Highrock and Eagle Creeks.

Lower Alkali Lake
Lower Alkali Lake is the southernmost and smallest lake, draining . Streams feeding the lake include Emerson, Barber, and Bare Creeks, as well as occasional overflow from Middle Alkali Lake.

See also
List of lakes of California

References

Endorheic lakes of California
Lakes of California
Lakes of Nevada
Endorheic lakes of Nevada
Lakes of Modoc County, California
Lakes of Washoe County, Nevada